Kezayit, k'zayit, or kezayis is a Talmudic unit of volume approximately equal to the size of an average olive. The word itself literally means "like an olive."  The rabbis differ on the precise definition of the unit:
 Rabbeinu Yitzchak (the Ri) defines it as one-half of a beytza (a beytza is the volume of an egg).
 Maimonides specified that a 'grogeret' (dried fig) was one-third of a beytza, making this the maximum size for a kezayit, which is smaller. Rabbeinu Tam made the argument explicitly, though, using a slightly different calculation came out with a maximum definition of three-tenths.
 According to some interpretations, including the Chazon Ish, the zayit is not related to other units by a fixed ratio, but rather should only be conceived of independently as the size of an average olive.

Its uses in halacha include:
 The minimum amount food that, when eaten, is halachically considered "eating."  This has implications throughout the spectrum of halacha, including:
 For prohibitions of consumption, as in the eating of milk and meat
 For the saying of a Bracha Ahrona (the traditional grace after meals)
 People exposed to at least a kezayit of the flesh of a dead body become ritually impure.

See also
 Ancient Hebrew units of measurement
 https://www.jewishvirtuallibrary.org

Units of volume
Jewish law and rituals